Walter DeMordaunt (c. 1895-1962) was an American architect who practiced in Pueblo, Colorado from 1920 to 1962.

He studied at the University of Utah.

One of his most notable works is the Young Women's Christian Association (1936) in Pueblo.

The Chaffee County Courthouse, designed in 1929, was controversial.

He died in 1962, aged 67.

References

1890s births
1962 deaths
Year of birth uncertain
University of Utah alumni
Architects from Colorado